Gary Allan is an American country music singer. His discography comprises ten studio albums, two greatest hits albums, and 32 singles. His first two albums were issued on Decca Records Nashville, while the other five and his Greatest Hits album were all issued on MCA Nashville. 1999's Smoke Rings in the Dark, 2001's Alright Guy and 2003's See If I Care are all certified platinum by the RIAA, while his 1996 debut Used Heart for Sale, 2005's Tough All Over, 2006's Greatest Hits, and 2007's Living Hard are all certified gold.

Out of Allan's 31 singles, all have charted on the US Billboard Hot Country Songs chart, and thirteen of these have also crossed over to the Billboard Hot 100. Among his singles are four Number Ones: "Man to Man", "Tough Little Boys" (both 2003), "Nothing On but the Radio" (2004), and "Every Storm (Runs Out of Rain)" (2013). Eight more have reached the Top 10. "Man to Man" is also his highest peak on the Hot 100 at number 25. Allan has also charted twice with songs that received unsolicited airplay: a 1997 cover of "Please Come Home for Christmas", and a 2000 cover of Del Shannon's "Runaway".

Studio albums

1990s

2000s

2010s–2020s

Compilation albums

Singles

1990s

2000s

2010s and 2020s

Other charted songs

Music videos

Notes

References

Country music discographies
 
 
Discographies of American artists